Trail of Lightning is a 2018 fantasy novel, the debut novel by Rebecca Roanhorse. After a supernatural disaster destroys most of North America, Navajo monster-slayer Maggie Hoskie must navigate a world of monsters and gods. The novel won the 2019 Locus Award for Best First Novel and was nominated for the Hugo, World Fantasy, and Locus Awards for Best Novel.

Plot summary
In the 21st century, a worldwide flood caused by multiple earthquakes along the New Madrid fault line destroys most of the United States as magic returns to the world. Dinétah becomes an independent nation. Certain Navajo people develop clan powers based on their ancestral tribes.

On Maggie Hoskie's sixteenth birthday, her grandmother is murdered by witches and monsters. This traumatic event activates her clan powers, giving Maggie superhuman speed and a propensity for killing. She attracts the attention of the immortal monster-slayer Neizghání and becomes his apprentice. Neizghání trains her in the art of combat, but abandons her when he perceives that she is becoming too violent. Maggie becomes a bounty hunter and monster-slayer. She seeks information about a new breed of monster from Tah, a local medicine man. Tah tells her that the monster was created by a powerful witch. He asks her to work with his grandson Kai Arviso, who also possesses clan powers, to destroy the witch.

Maggie and Kai retrieve information about a relic known as a "fire drill", which may be related to the monsters. She is visited by Mąʼii, the Coyote; Mąʼii tells her that the drill belongs to Mósí, a cat goddess. He also requests that she complete a task for him, giving her magical rings. Tah's hogan burns down; Maggie suspects Neizghání. In the carnage, Maggie and Kai kill a corrupt police officer. They seek shelter with Grace Goodacre, a local bar owner. Maggie, Kai, and Grace's children begin working together.

Mósí promises to give the fire drill to the winner of a duel. Maggie agrees and is ordered to fight Neizghání. He brands her and almost kills her, but she is rescued by Kai. Maggie seeks revenge against Neizghání, believing him to be responsible for the death of Tah and the creation of the monsters. They return to Black Mesa, where Maggie last saw Neizghání.

As Kai and the Goodacres are ambushed by monsters on Black Mesa, Mąʼii appears and reveals to Maggie that he controls the monsters. He was responsible for the murder of her grandmother, leading to the activation of her clan powers; he was also responsible for Maggie's duel with Neizghání. He wants to forge Maggie into a powerful warrior. Furious at this revelation, Maggie kills him and returns to the battlefield, where Neizghání has defeated the monsters and is now threatening Kai, whom he considers to be a rival. Neizghání offers Maggie a choice: fight and die now, or betray Kai and return to him. Maggie kills Kai, believing that his clan powers will resurrect him. She then uses Mąʼii's rings to bind Neizghání, temporarily incapacitating him and removing his powers. At Maggie's trailer, Tah and Maggie wait for Kai to return.

Background
Rebecca Roanhorse began writing fantasy as a hobby while pursuing a career as a lawyer. She stated that when she was unable to find a science fiction or fantasy novel with a Native American protagonist, she decided to write one. Roanhorse is Black and Ohkay Owingeh Pueblo, but she decided to write a story based on Navajo culture because her daughter is Navajo on her father's side. Roanhorse believes that many Native American fictional characters are portrayed as stuck in the past, and she wanted to use her novel to show Native characters as "alive and thriving".

Reception and awards
Trail of Lightning received mostly positive critical reviews. The Verge called it a "much-needed perspective to the larger canon of fantasy fiction", praising it for its portrayal of Native American characters. Critics also praised Trail of Lightning for its fast-paced action and complex characters. Locus called the novel "immensely readable and very enjoyable" and praised it for its worldbuilding; it also criticized the novel for shallow dialogue and a disjointed plot structure.

The Diné Writers' Collective criticized the novel as cultural appropriation, stating that someone not of Diné ancestry "does not have the authority or experience to write about our people and culture". They feel that important Navajo spiritual beliefs were portrayed inaccurately. They also criticized the way in which some book reviewers have conflated different tribes of Native Americans into one identity.

Trail of Lightning won the 2019 Locus Award for Best First Novel,  and was a finalist for the Nebula Award for Best Novel of 2018, the 2019 World Fantasy Award for Best Novel, and the 2019 Hugo Award for Best Novel.

References

2018 American novels
American fantasy novels
Debut speculative fiction novels
Native American novels
Native American mythology in popular culture
2018 debut novels
Saga Press books